The Religious Society of Friends (Quakers) played a major role in the abolition movement against slavery in both the United Kingdom and in the United States. Quakers were among the first white people to denounce slavery in the American colonies and Europe, and the Society of Friends became the first organization to take a collective stand against both slavery and the slave trade, later spearheading the international and ecumenical campaigns against slavery.

Beginnings
Quaker colonists began questioning slavery in Barbados in the 1670s, but first openly denounced it in 1688. In that year, four German settlers (the Lutheran Francis Daniel Pastorius and three Quakers) issued a protest from Germantown, close to Philadelphia in the newly founded American colony of Pennsylvania. This action, although seemingly overlooked at the time, ushered in almost a century of active debate among Pennsylvanian Quakers about the morality of slavery which saw energetic anti-slavery writing and direct action from several Quakers, including William Southeby, John Hepburn, Ralph Sandiford, and Benjamin Lay.

In the 1740s and 1750s, anti-slavery sentiment took a firmer hold. A new generation of Quakers, including John Woolman, Anthony Benezet, and David Cooper, protested against slavery, and demanded that Quaker society cut ties with the slave trade. They were able to carry popular Quaker sentiment with them and, beginning in the 1750s, Pennsylvanian Quakers tightened their rules, by 1758 making it effectively an act of misconduct to engage in slave trading. The London Yearly Meeting soon followed, issuing a ‘strong minute’ against slave trading in 1761. On paper at least, global politics would intervene. The American Revolution would divide Quakers across the Atlantic.

United Kingdom
In the United Kingdom, Quakers would be foremost in the Society for Effecting the Abolition of the Slave Trade in 1787 which, with some setbacks, would be responsible for forcing the end of the British slave trade in 1807 and the end of slavery throughout the British Empire by 1838.

United States

In the United States, Quakers would be less successful. In many cases, it was easier for Quakers to oppose the slave trade and slave ownership in the abstract than to directly oppose the institution of slavery itself, as it manifested itself in their local communities. While many individual Quakers spoke out against slavery after United States independence, local Quaker meetings were often divided on how to respond to slavery; outspoken Quaker abolitionists were sometimes sharply criticized by other Quakers.

Darby Borough, Pennsylvania's founder, John Blunston, took part in an early action against slavery in 1715. 

In The Friend, Vol. 28:309 there is text of a "minute made in 'that Quarterly Meeting held at Providence Meeting-house the first day of the Sixth month, 1715' ." It reads as follows
"A weighty concern coming before the meeting concerning some Friends being yet in the practice of importing, buying and selling negroe slaves; after some time spent in a so
Signed by order and on behalf of the Meeting, Caleb Pusey, Jno. Wright,Nico. Fairlamb, Jno. Blunsten"

Nevertheless, there were local successes for Quaker anti-slavery in the United States during the late eighteenth and early nineteenth century. For example, the Pennsylvania Abolition Society, first founded in 1775,  consisted primarily of Quakers; seven of the ten original white members were Quakers and 17 of the 24 who attended the four meetings held by the Society were Quakers. Throughout the nineteenth century, Quakers increasingly became associated with antislavery activism and antislavery literature: not least through the work of abolitionist Quaker poet John Greenleaf Whittier. North Carolina's Quakers often trusted their slaves to local meetings in order to de facto free their slaves, although state laws prohibited slaveowners from legally freeing their slaves; this practice ran from 1808 to 1829, after which trusteeship declined and many Quakers left the state to free their slaves in "free states."

Quakers were also prominently involved with the Underground Railroad. For example, Levi Coffin started helping runaway slaves as a child in North Carolina. Later in his life, Coffin moved to the Ohio-Indiana area, where he became known as "the president of the Underground Railroad." Elias Hicks penned the Observations on the Slavery of the Africans and Their Descendants and on the Use of the Produce of their Labour in 1811, urging the boycott of the products of slave labor. Many families assisted slaves in their travels through the Underground Railroad. Henry Stubbs and his sons helped runaway slaves get across Indiana. The Bundy family operated a station that transported groups of slaves from Belmont to Salem, Ohio.

Quaker anti-slavery activism could come at some social cost. In the nineteenth-century United States, some Quakers were persecuted by slave owners and were forced to move to the west of the country in an attempt to avoid persecution. Nevertheless, in the main, Quakers have been noted and, very often, praised for their early and continued antislavery activity.

Colorful Quaker and slave trader Zephaniah Kingsley defended slavery benevolently practiced. He advocated, and personally practiced, the mixing of the black and the white races through marriage, which he claimed was hygienic, productive of healthy and beautiful children, and a step towards integration of blacks and whites. He also was strongly in favor of allowing free blacks, who, he claimed, strengthened a country. His four "wives", or concubines, were former slaves he had freed. These views were tolerated in Spanish Florida, where he was a planter, but after Florida became a U.S. territory in 1821, Kingsley found it necessary, for the future security of his complicated family, to leave Florida permanently for a plantation he purchased in the new country of former slaves, Haiti.

Notes

Further reading
 Block, Kristen. "Cultivating Inner and Outer Plantations: Property, Industry, and Slavery in Early Quaker Migration to the New World." Early American Studies (2010): 515-548. online

 
 
 Carey, Brycchan. "“The Power that Giveth Liberty and Freedom”: The Barbadian Origins of Quaker Anti-Slavery Rhetoric." ARIEL: A Review of International English Literature 38.1 (2007). online  
 
 
 
 
 Frost, J. William. "Quaker Antislavery: From Dissidence to Sense of the Meeting." Quaker history 101.1 (2012): 12-33. excerpt

 

 Gerbner, Katharine. "'We Are against the Traffik of Men-Body': The Germantown Quaker Protest of 1688 and the Origins of American Abolitionism." Pennsylvania History  74.2 (2007): 149-172. online

 Gerbner, Katharine. "Antislavery in Print: The Germantown Protest, the" Exhortation," and the Seventeenth-Century Quaker Debate on Slavery." Early American Studies (2011): 552-575. online

 
  
 Jackson, Maurice, and Susan Kozel, eds. Quakers and their Allies in the Abolitionist Cause, 1754-1808 (Routledge, 2016) online.
  
 
 
 
 

 Marietta, Jack. "Egoism and altruism in quaker abolition." Quaker history 82.1 (1993): 1-22. extract
 
 Sassi, Jonathan D. "The Legacies of James McCarty: The Story of How Quakers Secured One Family’s Emancipation and Its Ramifications for Revolutionary-Era Antislavery." Early American Studies 16.2 (2018): 282-316. online
 
 Soderlund, Jean R. "Gary B. Nash and Quaker History." Quaker History 111.1 (2022): 51-60.

External links
Quakers and the Abolition of the Slave Trade
Quakers and Slavery: Resources and Information
Quakers and the Underground Railroad
Anti-slavery Movement: Quakers
Quakers and Slavery; Conference and Publication
Africans in America/Part 3/ Founding of Pennsylvania Abolition Society
MSN Encarta: Abolitionist Movement

History of Quakerism
Quakerism and slavery